Arothron carduus is a ray-finned fish in the family Tetraodontidae. It is an uncommon species and is native to the tropical and sub-tropical Indo-Pacific region.

Description

This species is characterised by having narrow black convoluted lines on a white background. It is similar in appearance to another very rare species, Arothron multilineatus from Pagbilao in the Philippines, which has narrow white convoluted lines on a black background.

Distribution and habitat
Arothron carduus is an uncommon fish and is known from two separate locations. In the eastern Indian Ocean it occurs in the seas around Penang Island, Malaysia, and in the Western Pacific Ocean, it occurs in the seas around the Ryukyu Islands, Japan. A dried specimen found in Japan may have originated from the Philippines.

Status
No particular threats to this fish have been recognised, but not enough is known about it to determine its population trends and conservation needs, so the International Union for Conservation of Nature has assessed its status as "data deficient". As a denizen of coral reefs, the degradation of the reefs may well have an adverse future effect on the species. However, parts of its known range are within the boundaries of some marine protected areas.

References 

carduus
Taxa named by Theodore Edward Cantor
Fish described in 1849